K2-58 (also designated as EPIC 206026904) is G-type main-sequence star in the constellation of Aquarius, approximately 596 light-years from Solar System. The star is metal-rich, having 155% of Solar abundance of elements heavier than helium. The star is located in the region allowing to see Venus transiting the Sun for hypothetical observer located in K2-58 system.

Planetary system
The planetary system has three confirmed exoplanets (named as K2-58 b, K2-58 c, K2-58 d), discovered in 2016.

References  

Aquarius (constellation)
Planetary systems with three confirmed planets
K-type main-sequence stars
J22151722-1402593
Planetary transit variables